Claridon, Ohio may refer to the following places in Ohio:
Claridon, Geauga County, Ohio
Claridon Township, Geauga County, Ohio
Claridon, Marion County, Ohio
Claridon Township, Marion County, Ohio